The Mitsubishi ASX (abbreviation of "Active Sports Crossover") is a subcompact crossover SUV manufactured by the Japanese automaker Mitsubishi Motors. On introduction, it was positioned below the Outlander in Mitsubishi's crossover SUV line-up, until the Eclipse Cross filled the gap between the ASX and Outlander in 2017. It was built on the GS platform closely shared with the Lancer and Outlander.

For the European market, the second-generation ASX is a rebadged Renault Captur, which will be sold from March 2023.



First generation (GA; 2010) 

The first-generation ASX was first released in the Japanese domestic market on 17 February 2010 as the Mitsubishi RVR. The RVR nameplate is only used in Japan, South Korea, and Canada. It is sold as the ASX in most markets, and also as the Mitsubishi Outlander Sport in the United States, Argentina, Brazil, and Indonesia. In Puerto Rico, it uses both the ASX and Outlander Sport titles.

The design of the ASX was previewed by the Mitsubishi Concept-cX prototype which was first exhibited at the 62nd Frankfurt Motor Show in July 2007. It is a return to the original concept of offering the platform used for the longer Outlander with reduced seating capacity to five people, while sharing components of the longer vehicle, demonstrating a corporate decision to return Mitsubishi to smaller, fuel efficient vehicles in favor of larger, truck-based products. It was also exhibited at the 40th Tokyo Motor Show in September the same year.

The European ASX was exhibited at the Geneva Motor Show in March 2010, while the North American market Outlander Sport/RVR was revealed at the 2010 New York International Auto Show. Between 2012 and 2015 production of the Outlander Sport began in Mitsubishi's Illinois plant, for both the North American and a number of export markets. , production of the ASX continues in Japan for the global market and China for the local market.

Facelifts 

The first facelifted ASX was revealed in the United States in April 2012 with changes focusing on its front fascia by reshaping the trapezoid grille, and a redesigned rear bumper. In addition, rocker panels became grey, while roof racks disappeared.

Going on sale in mid-2014, the 2015 model introduced some visual changes: new LED daytime running lamps were featured in the front bumper, there was a new 17" alloy wheel design, and roof racks appeared once again (after being removed in the 2013 model).

Further changes occurred in mid-2015 for the "2015.5" model. 18" wheels became standard, and featured black wheel arch surrounds. A chrome tailgate finish and a new steering wheel were other changes that year.

The second facelift was released in November 2015 at the Los Angeles Auto Show, which introduced the "Dynamic Shield" front design concept and redesigned alloy wheels. This version was introduced in Europe in September 2016 at the 2016 Paris Motor Show.

A third facelift was unveiled prior to the 2019 Geneva Motor Show in February 2019. The front received an updated "Dynamic Shield" design. In many markets this was to become the 2020 model year RVR/ASX/Outlander Sport. The facelift introduces a new front fascia design, new 18" alloy wheels, and a redesigned Smartphone Display Link (SDL) infotainment system with optional Apple CarPlay and Android Auto smartphone integration, and a new eight-inch touchscreen display.

In the U.S., the Outlander Sport gains a new SP trim to replace the previous LE trim. The 148-horsepower, 2.0-litre inline four-cylinder (I4) engine is standard on the ES and SE trims, while a 166-horsepower, 2.4-litre inline four-cylinder engine is standard on the SP and GT trims. The smaller 2.0 option is also now available with all-wheel drive (AWD) in addition to the standard front-wheel drive (FWD).

 Pre-facelift

 First facelift

 Second facelift

 Third facelift

 Fourth facelift

Powertrains 

The Japanese models are powered by the 4B10 1.8 L petrol engine mated to a manual or INVECS-III continuously variable transmission. North American, Singaporean, Chinese, Indonesian, Malaysian, Philippine, and Australian vehicles get the larger 4B11 2.0 L and 4B12 2.4 L engines starting from 2015 model year, while the European ASX use a new 4A92 1.6 L petrol engine. In Europe and Australia the 4N13 1.8 L direct-injection turbo-diesel engine is also available as options. With the 2015 model year update in Europe, the Mitsubishi 4N1 engine was replaced with PSA's DV6C engine. Much of the petrol engine range – 1.6 L (117 hp), 1.8 L (140 hp), and 2.0 L (150 hp) – is offered in the CIS market.

Markets

Indonesia 
In Indonesia, the Outlander Sport was launched on 10 July 2012 and offered in three grade levels: GLX, GLS, and PX. It was assembled locally at the Krama Yudha Ratu Motor plant in Pulo Gadung, Jakarta with knock-down kits imported from Japan. Production ended in 2018.

Malaysia 
In Malaysia, the ASX was launched in November 2010. At launch, only one variant was available which was fully imported and powered by a 2.0 L 4B11 engine paired with a CVT transmission. In January 2012, the sole variant was updated with larger alloy wheels, push-start button, better sportive front seats and auto-retractable side mirror. The first facelift was introduced in May 2013 which made features from the limited run Euro edition standard including a panoramic glass roof, auto rain, auto light sensors and GPS navigation with Bluetooth/iPod connectivity. In February 2014, locally assembled models went on sale now with two variants: 2WD and 4WD.

Second generation (2023) 

In 2016, Mitsubishi Motors executives announced that the successor of the RVR/ASX/Outlander Sport would be released in 2019 and was previewed by the electric eX Concept. The company mentioned that it would be an "in-house"-developed model.

In early 2022, the teaser for the second-generation ASX for European market was released, which would be based on the second-generation Renault Captur. It was revealed in September 2022 and will be released in March 2023 with gasoline, hybrid and plug-in hybrid powertrain options.

Production and sales

Annual production 

(Sources: 
Facts & Figures 2013, Facts & Figures 2018, Facts & Figures 2019, Mitsubishi Motors website)including OEM production supply (Citroën C4 Aircross and Peugeot 4008)

Sales

References

External links 

  (global)

ASX
Cars introduced in 2010
2020s cars
Mini sport utility vehicles
Crossover sport utility vehicles
ANCAP superminis
Front-wheel-drive vehicles
All-wheel-drive vehicles
Vehicles with CVT transmission